Skerritt is a surname. Notable people with the surname include:

Anton Skerritt (born 1964), Trinidadian/Canadian sprinter and soccer player
Ellen Skerritt (born 1994), Australian racing cyclist 
Paddy Skerritt (1926–2001), Irish golfer
Ricky Skerritt (born 1956), Saint Kitts and Nevis politician 
Tom Skerritt (born 1933), American actor